Robert Stanley Jones (28 October 1938 – 22 July 2015) was an English professional footballer who played as a forward for Bristol Rovers, Northampton Town and Swindon Town in the Football League, and for non-league sides Soundwell and Minehead.

He subsequently became player-manager of Paulton Rovers, before returning to Bristol Rovers as youth coach in January 1980. He later became manager of Bath City, Forest Green Rovers, Mangotsfield United, Yate Town and Oldland.

Honours
Individual
Football Conference Manager of the Month: March 1987

References

Sources

1938 births
2015 deaths
Footballers from Bristol
English footballers
Association football forwards
Soundwell F.C. players
Bristol Rovers F.C. players
Northampton Town F.C. players
Swindon Town F.C. players
Minehead A.F.C. players
English Football League players
English football managers
Paulton Rovers F.C. players
Paulton Rovers F.C. managers
Bath City F.C. managers
Forest Green Rovers F.C. managers
Mangotsfield United F.C. managers
Yate Town F.C. managers